Menars, also spelled Ménars, is a commune and town in the French department of Loir-et-Cher, Centre-Val de Loire, France. The Château de Menars, formerly owned by Madame de Pompadour is located here.

Population

See also
Communes of the Loir-et-Cher department
Château de Menars

References

Communes of Loir-et-Cher